Orocrambus scutatus is a moth in the family Crambidae. It was described by Alfred Philpott in 1917. It is endemic to New Zealand, where it has been recorded in Southland. The habitat of this species consists of subalpine tussock grassland.

The wingspan is 26–30 mm. Adults have been recorded on wing from December to January.

References

Crambinae
Moths described in 1917
Moths of New Zealand
Endemic fauna of New Zealand
Endemic moths of New Zealand